Eslamabad-e Sofla (also Romanized as Eslāmābād-e Soflá) is a village in Qaedrahmat Rural District, Zagheh District, Khorramabad County, Lorestan Province, Iran. At the 2006 census, its population was 175, in 36 families.

References 

Towns and villages in Khorramabad County